This is a list of international rankings of Namibia.

Politics

Reporters Without Borders 2013 Press Freedom Index ranked 19 out of 179
2008 Ibrahim Index of African Governance ranked 6 out of 53 African countries
Transparency International: 2013 Corruption Perceptions Index ranked 57 out of 177

References

Namibia